David Marcelo Pizarro Cortés (born 11 September 1979) is a Chilean former professional footballer who last played as a midfielder for Chilean Primera División club Universidad de Chile. He is usually deployed as a central midfielder, although he can also operate in a holding role in front of the back-line, in a more attacking position in the hole behind the strikers, or even as a deep-lying playmaker. An intelligent and technically gifted player, who possesses significant physical strength in spite of his diminutive stature, and an ability to dictate play in midfield, Pizarro is known in particular for his vision, range of passing, dribbling skills, and ability from set pieces.

Pizarro began his career in Chile with Santiago Wanderers, and later also played for Universidad de Chile in his home country; he later had spells with several Italian clubs, and also briefly played on loan with English side Manchester City in 2012, before returning to Chile in 2015. During his stay in Italian football, he won one Serie A title (2005–06), three Coppa Italia titles and two Supercoppa Italiana titles, while playing for Inter Milan and Roma; he also played for Udinese and Fiorentina during his time in Italy. His Italian nickname is "Pek", diminutive of "pequeño", meaning "small" in Spanish, because of his short stature (1.68 metres).

Pizarro played for the Chile national team, with which he won the bronze medal at 2000 Summer Olympics, and played at two Copa América tournaments. He made his full debut in 1999, playing at that year's Copa América, and was part of the Chilean squad which won its first-ever tournament in 2015.

In November 2018, he announced his retirement from professional football. His last match was on 2 December 2018, as a captain of Universidad de Chile, against Curicó Unido.

Club career

Early career / Inter Milan
Pizarro began his career at Santiago Wanderers in his hometown Valparaíso. After a season playing at Seaport Team since his promotion to the first-adult team in 1997, he joined Udinese of the Italian Serie A. In 2001, he was loaned to Chilean powerhouse Universidad de Chile to gain experience. Once back in Friuli, he settled as the Udinese's starting central midfielder, performing well during his five seasons there.

On 14 July 2005, Pizarro joined Inter Milan for a reported €10 million transfer (plus half the rights of striker Goran Pandev, whom Lazio purchased one year later for €4 million) on a four-year contract. At Inter, he failed to repeat his successful campaigns at Udinese, at times being overshadowed by Argentine star Juan Sebastián Verón. Nonetheless, Pizarro won the 2005–06 Serie A with Inter, plus the Coppa Italia and Supercoppa Italiana.

Roma
On 19 August 2006, Roma acquired 50% of Pizarro's rights, agreeing to a €6.5 million transfer fee for a four-year co-ownership deal. On his arrival, he chose shirt number 7 and reunited with his former head coach at Udinese, Luciano Spalletti.

On 12 September 2006, Pizarro scored his first competitive goal for Roma in a 4–0 UEFA Champions League victory over Shakhtar Donetsk in the 89th minute. Five days later, he scored twice in a 3–1 Serie A win over Siena. He also helped Roma win the 2006–07 Coppa Italia title, where was one of the team top-scorers with three goals. On 20 June 2007, Roma announced they paid Inter the remaining 50% of Pizarro's rights to keep him at the club until 2010. The next season, he was an undisputed starter with Daniele De Rossi in midfield, making over 30 league appearances as well as in the UEFA Champions League, where he scored a goal in a 2–1 win over Real Madrid to seal the club's progression to the quarter-finals. Pizarro also won the Coppa Italia with Roma that season.

In October 2009, Pizarro signed a contract extension which was to keep him at the club until June 2013. He finished the 2009–10 season with two goals and eight assists in 31 appearances, helping Roma finish second in Serie A behind eventual winners Inter.

Manchester City

On 31 January 2012, Pizarro signed for Manchester City on loan from Roma for the remainder of the 2011–12 season, reuniting his former head manager at Inter, Roberto Mancini. Pizarro made his debut four days later as an added-time substitute for Adam Johnson in City's 3–0 win against Fulham, becoming the first Chilean to play for Manchester City. On 22 February, he came off the substitutes' bench to score and had an assist against Porto in the UEFA Europa League as City won 4–0 in the second leg of the tie, having won 2–1 in the away leg.

On 13 May 2012, Manchester City were crowned Premier League champions for 2011–12 after defeating Queens Park Rangers 3–2. However, Pizarro only made five league appearances that season, not enough for a winners' medal. His loan spell with City came to an end and returned to Roma, after which he vowed not to move again.

Fiorentina
On 9 August 2012, Pizarro transferred to Fiorentina on a two-year contract. He played 83 times for Fiorentina, scoring four goals.

Pizarro was an unused substitute in the 2014 Coppa Italia Final, which Fiorentina lost 3–1 to Napoli.

Santiago Wanderers
Pizarro returned to Chile to join Santiago Wanderers on a two-year contract.

International career 

At youth level, Pizarro represented Chile at under-17 level in the 1995 South American Championship and at under-20 level in the 1999 South American Championship. 

At senior level, Pizarro began his international career in 1999. After being one of the best players of the South American Youth Championship that year, Chile manager Nelson Acosta gave him an opportunity in the senior team.

He played in the 1999 Copa America and also the 2000 Summer Olympics, where he won the bronze medal. He also participated in the 2002 and 2006 World Cup qualifiers, with Chile failing to qualify on both occasions.

In 2001, he made an appearance for Chile B in the friendly match against Catalonia on 28 December.

After failing to qualifying for the 2006 FIFA World Cup in Germany, Pizarro announced his retirement from international football, listing several reasons for his decision. He disliked ex-coach Juvenal Olmos and ex-association president Reinaldo Sánchez.4 Also, he believed the players on the national team played solely to gain popularity. He also said he wished to spend more time with his family.

On 20 May 2013, Pizarro was called up to the national team for the 2014 World Cup qualifiers, returning to the Chile squad after having meetings with head coach Jorge Sampaoli, thus ending his eight-year absence from international football. After failing to be named to Chile's 23-man squad list for the World Cup, he was part of the 2015 Copa América-winning squad.

Career statistics
Source:

Club

Notes

International

International goals

Honours
Inter Milan
 Serie A: 2005–06
 Coppa Italia: 2005–06
 Supercoppa Italiana: 2005

Roma
 Supercoppa Italiana: 2007
 Coppa Italia: 2006–07, 2007–08

Manchester City
 Premier League: 2011–12

Universidad de Chile
 Primera División de Chile : 2017 Clausura

International
 Olympic Games Bronze Medal: 2000
 Copa América: 2015

References

External links 
 

1979 births
Living people
Sportspeople from Valparaíso
Chilean footballers
Chilean expatriate footballers
Chile international footballers
Chile youth international footballers
Chile under-20 international footballers
Association football midfielders
1999 Copa América players
2015 Copa América players
Footballers at the 2000 Summer Olympics
Olympic bronze medalists for Chile
Olympic footballers of Chile
Olympic medalists in football
Chilean Primera División players
Serie A players
Premier League players
Udinese Calcio players
Universidad de Chile footballers
Santiago Wanderers footballers
Inter Milan players
A.S. Roma players
Manchester City F.C. players
ACF Fiorentina players
Expatriate footballers in Italy
Expatriate footballers in England
Chilean expatriate sportspeople in Italy
Chilean expatriate sportspeople in England
Copa América-winning players
Medalists at the 2000 Summer Olympics